Ali Çetinkaya, also known as "Kel" Ali Bey (1878 – 21 February 1949) was an Ottoman-born Turkish army officer and politician, who served eight terms in the Grand National Assembly of Turkey, including a period in 1939–40 as his country's first Minister of Transport.

Biography 

He was born in Kara Hisâr-i Sâhib (present day Afyonkarahisar) in Hüdavendigâr Vilayet as the son of Ahmed Efendi. He studied in the Bursa Military High School (Bursa Askerî İdadisi ). After graduating from military highschool, he entered the Ottoman Military Academy (Mekteb-i Füsûn-u Harbiyye-i Şâhâne ) In 1898 he graduated academy and joined the Ottoman military as a Second Lieutenant (Mülâzım-ı Sani ). During World War I, he served for the army in the Caucasus and Galicia fronts.

When the Greek forces were landing at Smyrna on May 15, 1919, he was a lieutenant colonel and the commander of 172nd Infantry Regiment stationed in the Aegean coastal town of Ayvalık. His regiment was under the command of the 56th Division of Hürrem Bey. Ali played a key role in the first stage of the Greco-Turkish War of 1919–1922, starting with the opening battle.

He was briefly able to hold back the advance into the city of Greek occupation forces. His action is considered to mark the first shots fired by regular forces in the 1919–22 Greco-Turkish War, although there were earlier confrontations in which irregular militias participated, including the battle involving Hasan Tahsin in İzmir, as well as actions in Urla and Ödemiş.
The hill in Ayvalık from where the first shots were fired is now called İlk Kurşun Tepesi (First Bullet Hill). Today there is a military rehabilitation center on that hill.

After the war, Ali Çetinkaya was elected to Turkish Grand National Assembly for eight successive terms and served until 1942, holding ministerial posts in six different governments, including, with the formation of a Ministry of Transport, becoming Turkey's first Minister of Transport.

Ali Çetinkaya died in Istanbul in the year of his 71st birthday.

Ali Çetinkaya is considered a hero in Turkey. Cunda Island of Ayvalık was renamed Alibey Adası (Ali Bey Island) after him, although the old name remains in common use.

References 
Ali Çetinkaya biographical sketch {in Turkish} at Biyografi.info (includes small photograph)

External links 
 Hasan Kundakçı, "Ali Çetinkaya'yı Anarken", Atatürk Araştırma Merkezi Dergisi, Sayı 38, Cilt: XIII, Temmuz 1997 

Date of birth unknown
1878 births
1949 deaths
People from Afyonkarahisar
People from Hüdavendigâr vilayet
Republican People's Party (Turkey) politicians
Government ministers of Turkey
Ministers of Transport and Communications of Turkey
Ministers of Public Works of Turkey
Deputies of Afyonkarahisar
Ottoman Army officers
Turkish Army officers
Ottoman military personnel of the Balkan Wars
Ottoman military personnel of World War I
Turkish military personnel of the Greco-Turkish War (1919–1922)
Members of the Special Organization (Ottoman Empire)
Malta exiles
Ottoman Military Academy alumni
Recipients of the Medal of Independence with Red-Green Ribbon (Turkey)
Members of the 7th government of Turkey
Members of the 8th government of Turkey
Members of the 9th government of Turkey
Members of the 10th government of Turkey
Members of the 11th government of Turkey
Members of the 12th government of Turkey